The tiger thick-toed gecko (Pachydactylus tigrinus) is a species of lizard in the family Gekkonidae. It is found in Zimbabwe, South Africa, Botswana, and Mozambique.

References

Pachydactylus
Reptiles of Zimbabwe
Reptiles of South Africa
Reptiles described in 1921